Vinícius Fedrigo Dall'Agnol (born 10 August 1990) is a Brazilian futsal player and a former footballer who plays for S.S. Lazio Calcio a 5.

Biography
Born in Guaporé, Rio Grande do Sul, Dall'Agnol signed a professional contract with Esporte Clube São José in March 2009. In January 2010 he was loaned to Parma's Primavera youth team. His loan was extended in 2010–11 season and he was sub-loaned to Lanciano. He made his club debut on 20 October 2010, winning Giulianova 4–1 in 2010–11 Coppa Italia Lega Pro. He also played the next cup match.

On 1 July 2011 he returned to Brazil. He immediately entered São José squad for 2011 Copa FGF He played 7 games out of possible 14 Group stage match. The club failed to advance to the next stage.

References

External links
 CBF 

Brazilian men's futsal players
Brazilian footballers
Esporte Clube São José players
Parma Calcio 1913 players
S.S. Virtus Lanciano 1924 players
Association football central defenders
Brazilian expatriate footballers
Brazilian expatriate sportspeople in Italy
Expatriate footballers in Italy
Sportspeople from Rio Grande do Sul
1990 births
Living people